Le Zitelle (officially Santa Maria della Presentazione) is a church in Venice, Italy. It is part of a former complex which gave shelter to young maidens ("zitelle" in Italian) who had no dowry, and is in the easternmost part of the Giudecca island.

Generally attributed to Andrea Palladio, the original design dates to 1579–80 and the construction to 1586. Its housing edifice surrounds the church in a horseshoe shape, with a court behind the apse. The façade has two orders, surmounted by a tympanum and flanked by two small bell towers. The church has a large dome with a roof lantern.

The interior is on the central plan. It houses works by Aliense, Leandro Bassano and Palma il Giovane.

The attribution to Andrea Palladio is not without controversy. The Centro Internazionale di Studi di Architettura Andrea Palladio points to a lack of contemporary documents and drawings confirming Palladio's involvement with the project and the fact that construction only started in 1581, one year after Palladio's death. They consider:...  a project by Palladio both possible and datable to the mid-1570s, but neither the façade nor the interior of the church display characteristics which are unequivocally related to Palladio’s language, unless in an extremely clumsy and unfaithful version.

The church is now only open on Sundays, and the Bauer Hotel has acquired the former convent and converted it into a 50-room luxury hotel – The Palladio.

Notes

Roman Catholic churches completed in 1586
16th-century Roman Catholic church buildings in Italy
Roman Catholic churches in Venice
Andrea Palladio church buildings
Dorsoduro
Renaissance architecture in Venice